Urophora hispanica is a species of tephritid or fruit flies in the genus Urophora of the family Tephritidae.

Distribution
France, Spain.

References

Urophora
Insects described in 1905
Diptera of Europe